The city of Nagpur is an educational hub for the central India region, hosting a number of institutions of higher education.

Universities

State University
 Rashtrasant Tukadoji Maharaj Nagpur University ( Nagpur University)
 Kavikulaguru Kalidas Sanskrit University
 Maharashtra Animal and Fishery Sciences University
 Maharashtra National Law University, Nagpur

Deemed Universities
 Symbiosis International Deemed University

Engineering and Technology

Central government
 Indian Institute of Information Technology, Nagpur
 National Power Training Institute 
 Visvesvaraya National Institute of Technology Nagpur

State government
 Government College of Engineering, Nagpur
 Indian Institute of Fire Engineering, Nagpur

University managed
 Cummins College of Engineering for Women, Nagpur
 Laxminarayan Institute of Technology

Autonomous
 G. H. Raisoni College of Engineering Nagpur 
 S. B. Jain Institute of Technology, Management and Research 
 Shri Ramdeobaba College of Engineering and Management 
 St. Vincent Pallotti College of Engineering and Technology 
 Yeshwantrao Chavan College of Engineering
 G H Raisoni Academy of Engineering and Technology
 JD College of Engineering and Management
 Tulashiramaji Gayakawad Patil College of Engineering and Technology
 Priyadarshini JL College of Engineering.

Non-Autonomous
 Nagpur Institute of Technology
 Nagarjuna Institute of Engineering Technology & Management
 Institute of Science, Nagpur
 Jhulelal Institute of Technology
 Kavikulguru Institute of Technology and Science
 Priyadarshini Institute of Engineering and Technology 
 Rashtrasant Tukadoji Maharaj Nagpur University
 Sharad Pawar College of Pharmacy
 Smt. Radhikatai Pandav College of Engineering, Nagpur
 St. Francis De Sales College
 Wainganga College of Engineering and Management
 Aabha Gaikwad-Patil College of Engineering
 Dr. Babasaheb Ambedkar College of Engineering and Research
 Gurunanak Institute of Engineering and Management
 ITM College of Engineering
 Nuva College of Engineering & Technology
 Priyadarshini Indira Gandhi College of Engineering
 Rajiv Gandhi College of Engineering & Research
 Shri Govindarao Wanjari College of Engineering and Technology
 Smt. Bhagwati Chaturvedi College of Engineering
 Smt. Rajshree Mulak College of Engineering for Women
 Suryodaya College of Engineering and Technology
 V.M. Institute of Engineering and Technology
 Vidya Niketan Institute of Engineering & Technology
 Vilasarao Deshamukh College of Engineering and Technology

Polytechnic

State government
 Government Polytechnic, Nagpur

Other
 Shri Datta Meghe Polytechnic

Law

Central government and State government
 Maharashtra National Law University, Nagpur

Other
 Symbiosis Law School, Nagpur

Management

Central government
 Indian Institute of Management Nagpur

Autonomous
Affiliated to RTMNU
 Datta Meghe Institute of Management Studies

Other
 Institute of Management Technology, Nagpur
 Shri Ramdeobaba College of Engineering and Management

Arts, Commerce and Science
 Dr. Ambedkar College, Nagpur
 Lady Amritbai Daga and Smt. Ratnidevi Purohit College for Women
 Shri Binzani City College
 Dhanwate National College
 St. Francis De Sales College
 G.H. Raisoni Department of Microbiology and Biotechnology
 G.S. College of Commerce and Economics
 Hislop College
 Institute of Science, Nagpur
 Shivaji Science College, Nagpur
 Vasantrao Naik Government Institute of Arts and Social Sciences

Medical

Central government
 All India Institute of Medical Sciences, Nagpur

State government 
 Government Medical College and Hospital, Nagpur
 Indira Gandhi Government Medical College, Nagpur

Private Medical College 
 NKP Salve Institute of Medical  Science and Hospital, Nagpur

 Datta Meghe Institute of Medical Science Wanadongri, Nagpur

Architecture
 Shri Datta Meghe College of Architecture

References

List
Nagpur
Universities and colleges in Nagpur
Nagpur-related lists
Nagpur